The list of Early Devonian (419.2 ± 2.8 to 393.3 ± 2.5 million years ago) land plants includes currently known vascular and potentially vascular plants, along with some possibly non-vascular plants, that have been described from global Early Devonian fossil assemblages.

List of land plants

References

See also
 Devonian

Devonian plants